Narince is a village in the Kâhta District, Adıyaman Province, Turkey. The village is populated by Kurds of the Mirdêsî tribe and had a population of 1,383 in 2021.

The hamlets of Halice, Karagöl and Terziyan are attached to Narince.

Notable people 

 Osman Sabri

References

Villages in Kâhta District
Kurdish settlements in Adıyaman Province